Home: Adventures with Tip & Oh is an American 2D animated television series produced by DreamWorks Animation and animated by Titmouse, which debuted on July 29, 2016, as a Netflix original series. It was developed by Ryan Crego and Thurop Van Orman. The series is based on the 2015 DreamWorks animated film Home, which in turn was based on the 2007 novel The True Meaning of Smekday by Adam Rex. With the exception of Matt Jones, who returned as the voice of Kyle, none of the original cast reprised their roles.

The second season  was  released on January 27, 2017.
A holiday special called Home for the Holidays was released on December 1, 2017. The fourth and final season was released on July 20, 2018.

The series began airing on Universal Kids in March 2019 until it got taken off in 2021, and again on March 1, 2022, August 8, 2022 and December 24 and 25, 2022.

Plot 
The animated series takes place after the events of the film Home, in the setting of Earth's newly combined human and alien culture. The title characters, a fearless human girl (Tip) and an overenthusiastic alien Boov (Oh), build upon their established friendship and find adventure while navigating the crazily combined world they now share.

The series includes pop songs performed by artist Rachel Crow as Tip.

Episodes 

A 1-hour Christmas special called Home: For the Holidays was released on December 1, 2017.

Cast

Main

Guest cast

References

External links
  at DreamWorks TV
  at Netflix
 

2010s American animated television series
2010s American black cartoons
2010s American comic science fiction television series
2016 American television series debuts
American sequel television series
2018 American television series endings
American children's animated comic science fiction television series
American children's animated musical television series
American flash animated television series
Television series created by Thurop Van Orman
Television series by DreamWorks Animation
Television series by Universal Television
Animated television shows based on films
Television series based on adaptations
Television series set in the future
Netflix children's programming
Animated television series about cats
Animated television series about extraterrestrial life
English-language Netflix original programming